Blackie & Kanuto (also titled Head over Hooves, Black to the Moon 3D, and Pup) is an animated comedy adventure film directed by Francis Nielsen and produced by Baleuko, Lumiq Studios, Film Investment Piedmont, Art'Mell and Talape.

The production was presented at the Cannes Film Festival in May 2012.

In Italy, Turin, Blackie & Kanuto's preview was on December 4, 2013.

Premise
Blackie is a black sheep. She lives, flawed and proud, on a farm where she is famous for combining everything. But this is not enough for Blackie: the sheep gets into her head to want to go to the Moon. And so the adventure has begun, an adventure where Blackie, accompanied by Kanuto, the sheepdog in love with the sheep, will meet many curious characters, as two birds known for the singing TV reality show from which they come, an opera-singing cow and a fashion designer wolf with a high level of fashion. Blackie wants to realize her goal, Kanuto doesn't even want to hear about rockets...how the adventure will end?

Production
The film project is a production of Baleuko, Lumiq Studios in Turin, Film Investment Piedmont, Art'Mell and Talape.

References

External links
  Head Over Hooves 
  Blackie & Kanuto 
 
 Official Fanpage Lumiq Studios'Blackie & Kanuto https://www.facebook.com/pages/Blackie-Kanuto/288702571224709
 Official Fanpage Blackie & Kanuto https://www.facebook.com/BlackieandKanuto

2012 films
2012 animated films
Animated films about animals
Films about sheep
Chinese animated films
Chinese adventure comedy films
French animated films
French adventure comedy films
Italian adventure comedy films
Spanish animated films
Spanish adventure comedy films
Italian animated films
Moon in film
2010s adventure comedy films
2012 comedy films
2010s English-language films
2010s Spanish films
2010s French films